Advanced Math and Science Academy Charter School (AMSA) is a charter school founded in 2005. It is located at 201 Forest Street in Marlborough, Massachusetts, U.S., in a few remodeled office buildings.

The school is widely recognized for its academic achievements, consistently scoring in the highest percentile among Massachusetts schools in the English, math and science MCAS exams. In 2018, U.S. News & World Report ranked the school the #2 high school in Massachusetts.

As a charter public school, AMSA receives funding from the Commonwealth of Massachusetts.  Students and their families have no direct costs other than uniforms and the fees for extra activities that have become common among most of Massachusetts' public schools.

Admission includes completing an application, attending an open house, and taking math and language arts tests that are solely used to determine placement in the right level of classes. Preference for the limited spaces is given first to siblings of current students regardless of residence, then to residents of Marlborough, Hudson, Clinton, and Maynard, and finally to any resident of Massachusetts.

The school is currently divided into a Lower School (grades 6-8) and an Upper School (grades 9-12) thus making a distinction between two parts of one continuous school.

History
On February 24, 2004, the Massachusetts Department of Education granted the Advanced Math and Science Academy Charter School a five-year charter.  Throughout the entire process, there had been a lot of controversy surrounding the school and founder (Julia Sigalovsky).  Opponents of the school managed to delay the opening of the school by a year by filing numerous lawsuits against the school.  The school had to convince lawyers to wait until the school's funding to recoup over $30,000 in legal fees.

The school finally opened on September 6, 2005, in time for the first day of school.  The original class consisted of 250 sixth and seventh graders.  In each successive year, one additional class of 6th graders were added to the school.  Following the 2010 school year, the school's charter was renewed for another five years.  On June 12, 2011, AMSA graduated its first class.  In 2015, the school's charter was renewed again for 2016-2020. In 2019, the school's charter was renewed without conditions for 2021-2025.

AMSA consists of three buildings originally beginning with a Lower School building for grades 6-9, and an Upper School building for grades 10-12. In 2010, AMSA moved the 9th grade to the Upper School. However, before the 2011-2012 school year, AMSA was able to lease one floor of another office building nearby in order to accommodate the vast growth of the student population. The building became known as the "White Building" and began to house a mixed array of additional classes and students. From then on, the Lower School held 6 and 7 graders and the Upper School and White Building both combined to hold the remaining 8-12 graders.

In 2014, teachers at the school unionized, organizing with the Teamsters Local 170, in response to reported poor treatment under then Executive Director John Brucato.

Midway through the 2016-2017 school year, the AMSA Board of Trustees appointed Dr. Anders Lewis to serve as the school's executive director, after having been teaching at AMSA since its inception and serving as the school's Humanities/History Department chair. Lewis stepped down as executive director midway through the 2018-2019 school year, and the interim executive director was then-principal Ellen Linzey. Then-vice principal Mike Nawrocki stepped in to fill the position of principal. History teacher Brianna Murphy assumes the office of vice principal. Also around this time, one of the two deans of students, James Friar left the school under unknown circumstances. The other dean, Dan Amaral, assumed his position.

In early 2018, AMSA became the first public institution in the state of Massachusetts to own a scanning electron microscope thanks to a donation from Thermo Fisher Scientific.

Mission statement
"AMSA will create an atmosphere of celebration of knowledge where children of all backgrounds and abilities excel in all subjects, especially in math, science and technology, empowering them to succeed in the workplace in our modern high-tech world."

Legal challenges
A lawsuit filed by three local school districts (Maynard, Hudson, and Marlborough) charged that the Massachusetts Department of Education failed to observe its own rules in granting the charter.  The municipalities lost their case when the Supreme Judicial Court ruled that municipalities have no right to judicial review of the chartering process.  The MetroWest Daily News reported that local school districts have no role in the granting of a charter, that the State Board of Education has "the final decision" on granting charters.

AMSA also faced many challenges with its landlord and withheld rent for many years as the buildings were not up to standard. This dispute ended in court with the landlord giving the school a large sum of money.

Athletics & Extracurriculars

Lower School
The Lower School Eagles currently participate in interscholastic cross country, soccer, baseball, softball, basketball, wrestling, fencing, track and lacrosse with other sports coming soon. They currently rent out ForeKicks (a  sports complex that is next door, it has a facility with indoor fields, basketball courts, etc.) for Physical Education class.

Upper School
The Upper School Eagles are members of the Massachusetts Interscholastic Athletic Association effective of the beginning of the 2010-2011 school year.  Some sports also field junior varsity and/or middle school teams. 
Interscholastic sports currently known to be offered are:

Fall season
Cross-country (*)
Soccer (|)
Volleyball
Fencing (*)
Football (co-op with Maynard High School)
Winter season
Basketball (|)
Wrestling (*)
Hockey
Fencing (*)
Swimming (*)
Spring season
Track and field (*)
Baseball
Softball
Lacrosse (|)
Fencing (*)
Golf
Tennis (co-op with Marlborough High School)
Football (co-op with Maynard High School) 

(*) Denotes co-ed teams
(|) Denotes separate boys and girls teams
(teams differ depending on the year)

For extracurriculars, students have many options.

 Curling team (9-12)
 Gay Straight Alliance (6-12)
 Operation Smile (8-12)
 Racing club (9-12)
 Animal activist club (6-12)
 Art club (6-12)
 AMSA Coding (6-12)
 Best Buddies (9-12)
 Black Student Union (6-12)
 Book club (6-8)
 Botball (6-12)
 CS Gems/Gents (6-8)
 Drama society (6-12)
 Dungeons and Dragons club (6-12)
 Ecology club (6-12)
 French club (9-12)
 Math team (6-8, 9-12 as separate teams)
 Gaming club (6-12)
 Harry Potter club (6-12)
 Jazz band (6-12)
 JCL (6-12)
 Leader of Tomorrow (7-12)
 Middle School Girls Math club (6-8)
 Middle School Speech & Debate (6-8)
 Military history club (9-12)
 Model UN (9-12)
 NAHS (9-12)
 National Science Bowl (6-12)
 A Cappella group — the Photosymphonizers (9-12)
 Quiz Bowl (8-12)
 Science Olympiad Team (9-12)
 Ski club (8-12)
 Spanish club (9-12)
 Spanish Honor Society (9-12)
 Speech & Debate (9-12)
 Technovation (9-12, girls only)
 The Quill Literary Magazine (9-12)
 UNICEF (9-12)
 Yoga club (6-12)

References

External links
Advanced Math & Science Academy Charter School homepage
Article from Christian Science Monitor, June 7, 2006
Charter school suit seen, Boston Globe, March 21, 2004
Hostility inflames charter school debate, Boston Globe, February 22, 2004.

Marlborough, Massachusetts
Educational institutions established in 2005
Public middle schools in Massachusetts
Charter schools in Massachusetts
Schools in Middlesex County, Massachusetts
Public high schools in Massachusetts
2005 establishments in Massachusetts